The flag of Tamil Eelam was designated as the national flag of the proposed state in 1990. The tiger symbol of the Liberation Tigers of Tamil Eelam (LTTE) was created in 1977, differentiating it from the LTTE's emblem by leaving out the letters inscribing the movement's name. In 2005, the LTTE released a guide providing instructions and explaining the correct usage of the Tamil Eelam Flag. The guide written in Tamil specifies the regulations for flying alone or with national flags of other countries, and for general handling of the flag. The flag has four colours: yellow, red, black, and white. It is banned in Sri Lanka and is often seen at protests and functions concerning Tamil Eelam nationalism around the world.

Symbolic meaning

Tiger symbol

The jumping tiger was adopted from the emblem of the Chola Empire, it should reflect the martial history (Veera varalaru) and the national upheaval of the Tamils. The national flag is the symbol of the independent state of Tamil Eelam to be created, rooted in the martial traditions (Veera marapuhal) of the Tamils," LTTE organ Viduthalai Puligal said in its February 1991 issue.

Crossed bayonets and circle

Vellupillai Prabhakaran himself mentioned in a Tamil interview the circle and crossed bayonets represent the armed resistance and were based on the historical shield with crossed swords flag of Pandara Vanniyan. The circle sometimes considered to be a "Uthaya Suriyan" (rising sun) which is a symbol of Sri Lankan Tamils and earlier political movements. The LTTE leader was often compared to Pandara Vanniyan of Vannimai, because both had a similar fate. Pandara Vanniyan was a freedom fighter during the British colonial era in Sri Lanka.

The use of the flag of Tamil Eelam in public was controversial in other countries, such as Canada, due to the depiction of the bayonets as it was believed it indirectly promoted violence. Supporters of the flag pointed out that the flag of Sri Lanka depicts a lion carrying a sword.

33 bullets

The bullets symbolise the historical 33 years between 1948 - 1981 (oppression the Tamil population by the Sri Lankan government before the outbreak of Sri Lankan Civil War).

11 bullets on the left
11 bullets on the right
11 bullets at the top
total: 33 bullets

Colours

Four aspects of ideals and mission of Tamil Eelam represented by the four colours are detailed in the published guide book.

The yellow signifies that Tamils' aspiration to freely govern themselves in their own homeland is a fundamental political and human right. The colour expresses the righteousness of Tamil struggle and reinforces Tamil Nation's will to uphold moral highground during its path towards freedom.

The red represents the realisation that freedom is not complete by establishment of a separate state of Tamil Eelam. Distinctions of caste and class should be abolished. Egalitarianism should become their spiritual principle. Gender equality should permeate Tamil society. The revolutionary changes necessary to spread social justice represented by these principles are reflected by this colour.

The black reminds that march towards freedom is wrought with dangers, death and destruction, that is filled with pain and misery. It signifies determination and resoluteness vital to withstand the adversities and build the new nation of Tamil Eelam, to provide security and to defend the borders.

The white demands purity, honesty and selflessness from the leaders and citizens of Tamil Eelam.

National anthem

Eruthu Paar Kodi (Look the Flag is Rising) is a Tamil song, written by Puthuvai Rathinathurai, sung at the hoisting of the Flag of Tamil Eelam. As the most widely used song of the Tamils, it was used in the place of a national anthem by the Liberation Tigers of Tamil Eelam. The song was written during the Sri Lankan Civil War.

Lyrics 
The song praises the flag and describes the pride of Tamil Eelam army

Symbols of Tamil Eelam

See also
 Flags of Tamils
 List of Tamil Nadu state symbols, for symbols of the state in India

References

Tamil Eelam
Tamil Eelam
Tamil Eelam
Tamil Eelam
Tamil Eelam